The 1st Royal Saxon Guards Heavy Cavalry (Garde-Reiter-Regiment (1. Schweres Regiment)) was a heavy cavalry of the Royal Saxon Army. Established in 1680 as a cuirassiers unit, the regiment fought in the Battle of Vienna (1683), the Nine Years' War, the War of the Spanish Succession, the Silesian Wars, the Napoleonic Wars, the Austro-Prussian War, the Franco-Prussian War and World War I. The regiment was disbanded in 1919.

See also
 List of Imperial German cavalry regiments

References
 

Cavalry regiments of the Bavarian Army
Guards regiments of Germany
Regiments of the German Army in World War I
Military units and formations established in 1680
Military units and formations disestablished in 1919
1680 establishments in the Holy Roman Empire